Warman may refer to:

Places
 Warman, Minnesota, United States, an unincorporated community
 Warman, Saskatchewan, Canada, a city

People with the surname
 Arturo Warman (1937–2003), Mexican anthropologist
 Bob Warman (born 1946), British television presenter
 Clive Wilson Warman (1892-1919), American World War I flying ace
 Francis Warman, Archdeacon of Aston from 1965 to 1977
 Guy Warman (1872-1953), Anglican bishop
 Johnny Warman (born 1951), English rock and roll singer and songwriter
 Matt Warman,  British Conservative Party politician, MP for Boston and Skegness since May 2015
 Richard Warman (born 1968), Canadian human rights lawyer
 Joshua Warman (born 2001), Canadian musician

See also
 Wahrmann
 Janne "Warman" Wirman (born 1979), Finnish keyboard player